Moses Bledso Corwin (January 5, 1790 – April 7, 1872) was a United States representative from Ohio.

Biography
Born in Bourbon County, Kentucky, Corwin spent the early part of his life on a farm, and attended rural schools. He studied law, and was admitted to the bar in 1812. He began practicing law in Urbana, Ohio.

Career
Corwin was a member of the Ohio House of Representatives in 1838 and 1839, and was elected as a Whig to the Thirty-first United States Congress (March 4, 1849 – March 3, 1851), and was again elected to the Thirty-third Congress (March 4, 1853 – March 3, 1855).

Family life
Corwin's cousin, Thomas Corwin, was a U.S. Representative, Senator and Treasury Secretary; his cousin, Franklin Corwin, served one term as a Representative; his son, John A. Corwin, was his Democratic opponent in the 1848 Congressional election.

Death
He engaged in the practice of law until his death at age 82. He was interred in Oak Dale Cemetery.

Sources

1790 births
1872 deaths
People from Bourbon County, Kentucky
People from Urbana, Ohio
Members of the Ohio House of Representatives
Ohio lawyers
Whig Party members of the United States House of Representatives from Ohio
19th-century American politicians
19th-century American lawyers